Epiblema inulivora is a moth belonging to the family Tortricidae. The species was first described by Edward Meyrick in 1932.

It is native to Europe.

References

Eucosmini
Moths described in 1932